Sky Plus is a commercial radio station in Estonia. The radio station was launched in 1997 and is owned by Sky Media Group. Its sister station in Russian language is SKY Radio.

References

External links

Radio stations established in 1997
Radio stations in Estonia
1997 establishments in Estonia
Mass media in Tallinn